Olga Loizou (born 3 December 1961) is a Cypriot swimmer. She competed in the women's 100 metre freestyle at the 1980 Summer Olympics.

References

1961 births
Living people
Cypriot female swimmers
Olympic swimmers of Cyprus
Swimmers at the 1980 Summer Olympics
Commonwealth Games competitors for Cyprus
Swimmers at the 1978 Commonwealth Games
Place of birth missing (living people)
Cypriot female freestyle swimmers